Ann(e) Ferguson may refer to:

Anne Ferguson (judge), in Supreme Court of Victoria
Ann Ferguson, philosopher
Anne Ferguson (physician), Scottish gastroenterologist
Patricia Ann Ferguson, Scottish engineer